Ralph Jay Hexter (born 1952) is a distinguished professor of classics and comparative literature at the University of California, Davis.  Previously, he served as the fifth president of Hampshire College.

Education
Hexter received an A.B. in English literature from Harvard College in 1974. He then studied in England, where he earned a B.A. and M.A. in classics and modern languages at Corpus Christi College, Oxford in 1977 and 1982, respectively. He also earned an M.Phil. and a Ph.D. in comparative literature from Yale University in 1979 and 1982, respectively. Hexter subsequently taught in the classics department at Yale from 1981 to 1991.

Career
Hexter taught classics and comparative literature at the University of Colorado at Boulder and at Yale University. He was also the Executive Dean of Letters and Science and Dean of Arts and Humanities at the University of California, Berkeley. Hexter assumed the Hampshire College presidency on August 1, 2005, a post he relinquished on December 31, 2010.

Hexter has been involved with the Association of Independent Colleges and Universities in Massachusetts, Phi Beta Kappa, the American Philological Association, and the National Conference for Community and Justice.

On August 2, 2010, Hexter announced his resignation as president of Hampshire. On August 20, Hampshire College announced that Marlene Gerber Fried would serve as acting president and that Hexter would be on sabbatical beginning on September 1.

On November 22, 2010, it was announced that Ralph Hexter would be the next Provost and Executive Vice Chancellor at the University of California, Davis, effective January 1, 2011. His faculty title is Distinguished Professor of Classics and Comparative Literature.

Personal life
Hexter is openly gay. He was among the founding members of LGBTQ Presidents in Higher Education. Hexter married his longtime partner, Manfred Kollmeier, in 2007.

Bibliography
Equivocal Oaths and Ordeals in Medieval Literature, by Ralph J. Hexter, Cambridge, Mass.: Harvard University Press, 1975.
Ovid and Medieval Schooling: Studies in Medieval School Commentaries on Ovid's Ars Amatoria, Epistulae ex Ponto, and Epistulae Heroidum, by Ralph J. Hexter, Munich: Arbeo-Gesellschaft, 1986.
Innovations of Antiquity, edited by Ralph Hexter and Daniel Selden, New York: Routledge, 1992.
A Guide to the Odyssey: A Commentary on the English Translation of Robert Fitzgerald, by Ralph J. Hexter, New York: Vintage Books, 1993.
The Faith of Achates: Finding Aeneas' Other, by Ralph J. Hexter, Berkeley, CA: Doe Library, University of California, 1997.
The Oxford Handbook of Medieval Latin Literature, edited by Ralph J. Hexter and David Townsend. New York: Oxford University Press, 2012.
Appendix Ovidiana: Latin Texts Ascribed to Ovid in the Middle Ages, edited by Ralph Hexter, Larua Pfuntner, and Justin Haynes. Dumbarton Oaks Medieval Library 62. Cambridge, Mass: Harvard University Press, 2020.

References

External links
Provost and Executive Vice Chancellor Ralph J. Hexter via University of California, Davis

1952 births
Living people
Harvard College alumni
Yale University alumni
University of Colorado Boulder faculty
University of California, Berkeley College of Letters and Science faculty
Presidents of Hampshire College
American gay men
Gay academics
University of California, Davis administrators